The first season of The Real Housewives of Beverly Hills, an American reality television series, aired on Bravo from October 14, 2010 to February 15, 2011, and is primarily filmed in Beverly Hills, California.

The season focuses on the personal and professional lives of Taylor Armstrong, Camille Grammer, Adrienne Maloof, Kim Richards, Kyle Richards and Lisa Vanderpump. The season consisted of 17 episodes.

The seasons executive producers are Andrew Hoegl, Barrie Bernstein, Lisa Shannon, Pam Healy and Andy Cohen.

Production and crew
On March 10, 2010, The Real Housewives of Beverly Hills was announced as the sixth installment in the network's The Real Housewives franchise.

In June 2010, production for the first season was revealed to have been underway. 

On August 31, 2010, the full cast, trailer and premiere date were announced.

The season premiere "Life, Liberty and the Pursuit of Wealthiness" aired on October 14, 2010, while the thirteenth episode "Unforgivable" served as the season finale, and was aired on January 20, 2011.

On January 27 and February 1, 2011, a two-part reunion aired.

On February 8, 2011, a "Lost Footage" episode aired.

On February 15, 2011, an extended version of "The Dinner Party From Hell" titled "Dinner Party From Hell: Producers Cut" aired, which marked the conclusion of the season.

The seasons executive produces are Alex Baskin, Chris Cullen, Douglas Ross, Greg Stewart, Toni Gallagher, Dave Rupel and Andy Cohen; it is produced and distributed by Evolution Media.

Cast and synopsis

Cast
The first season of The Real Housewives of Beverly Hills introduced six women to the franchise, that are described as "the most affluent women in the country," as well as describing their affluence and wealth with, "these women are in the center of it all and they have the mansions, the cars, and the diamonds to prove it."

The Real Housewives of Beverly Hills was the second series in The Real Housewives franchise to featured family members, following The Real Housewives of New Jersey, with sisters Kim and Kyle Richards. The series also includes Taylor Armstrong, Camille Grammer, Adrienne Maloof, and Lisa Vanderpump.

Taylor Armstrong moved to Beverly Hills in 2003 from her hometown of Oklahoma. She met her husband, Russell Armstrong, and together they have a daughter, Kennedy. In addition to being a wife and mom, Armstrong is a philanthropist and business woman. Armstrong founded her own SAP firm, e-Implement Inc. and volunteers for the 1736 Family Crisis Center. She has adapted the "work hard, play hard" attitude, which allows her to maintain her identity in Beverly Hills.

Camille Grammer joined the series reluctantly, revealing that her husband at the time, Kelsey Grammer, encouraged her to join the series. Grammer is regarded as a “triple threat” with experience as a model, actress, and dancer. Her career as a dancer began when she was cast on Club MTV. The Grammers were married for 13 years and together they have a daughter, Mason, and a son, Jude. The pair have mixed business with pleasure through their production company, Grammnet Inc. The production company is known for producing successful shows including; Medium, Girlfriends and The Game.

Adrienne Maloof is a businesswoman from a very affluent and successful family. She moved to Beverly Hills with her family from Albuquerque, New Mexico when she was 1976. Throughout the years, her family built the Maloof dynasty- sports and entertainment enterprise which includes the Sacramento Kings, Palms Casino Resort, Sweeping Palms Entertainment and the Maloof Money Cup. Maloof was married to Dr. Paul Nassif, a renowned plastic surgeon and together they have three sons; Gavin, and twins Christian and Colin.

Kim Richards is a former child actress who was once referred to as the "Disney Girl" for starring in the movies, Escape to Witch Mountain and No Deposit, No Return. Richards appeared on several television programs including; Nanny and the Professor, James at 15, Hello, Larry, Diff'rent Strokes, CHiPS and Magnum, P.I. Richards' career came to an end when she retired after starring in the feature film Tuff Turf, alongside James Spader and Robert Downey Jr. She focused her time on raising her family of four kids, Brooke, Whitney, Chad, and Kimberly. She continues to work running a jewelry and water bottle line in which proceeds go to charity.

Kyle Richards, like her sister, is also a former child actress who landed her first role in Escape to Witch Mountain alongside Kim. Richards has starred in several movies including; Halloween and The Watcher in the Woods and on television with credits including; Little House on The Prairie, Carter Country, Down To Earth and ER. When Richards isn't working, she focuses her time on being a loving wife to high-end realtor, Mauricio Umansky, and mother to her four daughters; Farrah, Alexia, Sophia, and Portia.

Lisa Vanderpump has made a name for herself since moving to Beverly Hills. She came to California from Monte Carlo and the South of France, however she was born and raised in Dulwich, London. The witty Brit has been married to her husband, restaurateur Ken Todd, for 27 years and they have two children together; Pandora and an adopted son Max. The couple have filled their mansion-style home with plenty of dogs who they consider to be their children as well. Vanderpump has a keen eye for style. In Europe she styled homes, yachts, and the 26 restaurants, bars and clubs she and Ken owned in London. The couple brought their fine dining passion to Beverly Hills and own the restaurants, Villa Blanca and SUR Restaurant & Lounge. When not running the restaurants or spending time with her family, Vanderpump writes for the Beverly Hills Lifestyle magazine and continues to run her skin-care line, Epione.

Synopsis
The Real Housewives of Beverly Hills series begins with Adrienne Maloof revealing that she and her family own the professional basketball team, Sacramento Kings. Maloof intends to attend a game and invites the other wives along, her neighbor and witty British restaurateur, Lisa Vanderpump, former child actresses and sisters, Kyle and Kim Richards, a beauty from Oklahoma, Taylor Armstrong and the soon-to-be ex-wife of renown actor Kelsey Grammer, Camille Grammer. The women all fly via private jet to get a VIP treatment, court-side at the game.

Kim finds herself arguing with her sister, Kyle, at their family vacation home after being accused of having no life outside of her children. The conflict later escalates during Kim's daughter's birthday at a spa. Tensions between the two sisters continues to worsen, after Kim refuses to stand up for Kyle in New York City against Grammer. The two sister's reach an explosive point in their relationship at a rooftop party for Armstrong's birthday. Kim accuses Kyle of stealing her house and Kyle calls Kim out for being an alcoholic.

Kyle and her husband decide to take a trip to the Napa Valley for an intense charity bike ride, but debate whether to take their daughters or not. Kyle hosts her annual white party with the ladies in attendance, but Armstrong's issues with her husband take center stage. Kyle is emotional when her daughter Farrah reaches a milestone in life when graduating from college. Kyle is left saddened by her nieces, Paris and Nicky Hilton, choice of a trip to Europe over attending the graduation.

Grammer who is alone in Beverly Hills is elated by a trip to the Palms Casino Resort, but she soon butts heads with Kyle with the fight continuing back in Beverly Hills. In her home in Hawaii, Grammer opens up about her marriage. Grammer invites all the ladies to her husband's Broadway musical in New York, but Kyle is worried from what happened between her and Grammer in Las Vegas. All goes well until they all sit down for dinner and the truth comes out. Grammer decides to take up some retail therapy, but soon goes on overdrive after learning her husband is nominated for a Tony Award and decides to buy some expensive dresses. The distance between her and her husband grows apart even further after Kelsey reveals he wants to stay in New York, as his career in Los Angeles is over and he feels more appreciated there. Grammer isn't keen on the idea of moving to New York as her home is in Beverly Hills. Later, the drama between Grammer and Kyle escalates at Grammer's Malibu home when she hosts a dinner party. In attendance is Allison DuBois, a psychic and Grammer's friend. DuBois stuns everyone at the table after telling revealing what she sees in Kyle's future. Kelsey continues to spend time in  New York which leaves Grammer realizing the crack in their marriage. Grammer's relationship later worsen when Kelsey reveals he wants to end their marriage.

Armstrong spends $50,000 on an over-the-top, Mad Hatter inspired tea-party for her daughter's birthday, but is soon upstaged by her husband when he buys their daughter a puppy. Armstrong speaks at a charity poker tournament, with Maloof attendance for support, she reveals that she is a child of domestic violence. Armstrong hosts a costume party inspired by the roaring twenties era. Everyone is left feeling anxious at the party when Grammer and Kyle come face-to-face for the first time since the blow-up at Grammer's home in Malibu. Armstrong's marital issues continues after Kyle's white party, she looks for ways to resolve them.

Maloof heads to Las Vegas for a photo shoot with at hot model, but bringing her husband Paul doesn't end up being a good idea. In Vegas, Maloof invites the rest of the ladies to the Palms Casino Resort to see Jay-Z perform.

Vanderpump receives a sentimental gift for her birthday from her husband, two children and her house-guest, Cedric who she views as a son. Vanderpump witnessing the drama attempts to lighten the mood of the group by setting Kim up on a date with her millionaire friend. Vanderpump helps Cedric get his license, but is surprised at the type of people at the DMV. Vanderpump hosts a charity event for burn victim at her restaurant Villa Blanca, but Grammer decides not to attend due to her drama with Kyle. Vanderpump supports Cedric after a shocking relation of his past involving his family and his journey to the states.

Reception

U.S. television ratings
The Real Housewives of Beverly Hills premiered to 1.5 total million viewers and the series' ratings continued to grow, attracting 3.7 million viewers between the 9 p.m. and 10 p.m. airings for the January 13, 2011 episode "Turn, Turn, Turn", making it the number one telecast among adults 18–49 versus all cable competition in the time slot.

The finale of The Real Housewives of Beverly Hills season 1, that aired on January 20, 2011, became the highest-rated episode of the season with 4.2 million viewers, when combined with multiple evening reruns.  The Real Housewives of Beverly Hills''' first season ranked as the second highest rated first season series of the Real Housewives franchise ever in all demographics, averaging 2.42 million total viewers and 1.71 million adults 18–49.

Awards
In 2011, The Real Housewives of Beverley Hills'' won a Critics Choice Award, in a tie with Hoarders, for best reality series.

Taglines
The housewives' taglines for the first season were:

 Adrienne  "Money is what I have, not who I am."
 Camille  "It's time for me to come out of my husband's shadow and shine."
 Kim  "I was a child star, but now my most important role is being a mother."
 Kyle  "In a town full of phonies, I'm not afraid to be me."
 Lisa  "In Beverly Hills it's who you know, and I know everyone."
 Taylor  "It may look like I have it all, but I want more."

Episodes

References

External links

 
 
 

2010 American television seasons
2011 American television seasons
Beverly Hills (season 1)